Grahamstown is a city in South Africa.

Grahamstown may also refer to:

 The National Arts Festival, also known as the Grahamstown Festival, held annually in Grahamstown in South Africa
 Grahamstown, New South Wales, a small village near Tumblong in Australia
 Grahamstown, one of the two historic town centres that now form Thames, New Zealand
 Grahamstown, a former name of the Whangārei, New Zealand, suburb now known as Onerahi
 Grahamstown, a Subdivision (land) in the town of Raymond Terrace Australia
 Grahamstown Dam, an artificial lake providing drinking water to towns in the Hunter and Central coast regions of New South Wales, Australia